Bartley P. Griffith (born 1949) is an American heart surgeon.

Griffith is currently The Thomas E and Alice Marie Hales Distinguished Professor in Transplantation at the University of Maryland School of Medicine. He has been continuously funded as a principal investigator at the NIH since 1990. He has published more than 900 peer reviewed papers and 84 book chapters. He has prioritized teaching of young surgeons and was the residency coordinator from 1990-2019. He is board certified in cardiothoracic surgery and is a Fellow in the American College of Surgeons (1984) and in the Royal College of Surgeons Ed.  Ad hominem (1999).  With dinner partner and co honoree Pittsburgh Pirate legend Willie Stargell he was inducted as a history maker into the Western Pennsylvania History Museum (1999). He received the Lacrosse Rolex Award (1997). He is an accomplished skier, sailor, and marathon runner. He has been married to Denise since 1971 and co-raised 3 boys. He now enjoys 6 grandchildren.
Dr. Griffith trained in general and cardiothoracic surgery at the University of Pittsburgh 1974-1981.  He was mentored by Henry Bahnson, Mark Ravitch, and Peter Safer. He joined the Pitt faculty in 1981 and rose to full professor with tenure in 1988. He became the Henry T. Bahnson Professor of Surgery and was named Chief of the Division of Cardiac Surgery in 1990.
In training he was awarded a fellowship from the AHA to study mechanical ventilation and oxygenation with HS Borovetz PhD as an artificial placenta (J Appl Physiol 47:706, 1979). His laboratory work and visits with Robert Bartlett then of UC Irvine stimulated the establishment of a rare pediatric ECMO team. The team was first to demonstrate the benefit of ECMO in support of babies with diaphragmatic hernia (J Thorac Cardiovasc Surg, 81:556-563, 1981). 
He and his young surgical mentor Robert Hardesty helped to lead the resumption of heart transplantation abandoned 12 years previously after a single case. When Thomas Starzl arrived in 1982, he brought the new antirejection drug cyclosporine which Griffith (Ann Surg, 196:324-329, 1982) and Shumway’s team at Stanford applied to hearts. Improved outcomes were communicated early on and fueled the growth of heart transplantation (Ann Surg, 204:308-314, 1986). This early use of a novel immunosuppressant was repeated a decade later when Starzl enabled the heart and lung team to explore the use of tacrolimus. Tac became the successor key drug because of its relative efficacy and reduced toxicity (J Thorac Cardiovasc Surg 1996; 111:764-7). He was an early adopter in 1982 of Reitz’s heart-lung transplantation procedure done 6 months previously and developed a method of auto perfusion of the donor heart lung bloc for their first procurement at a distance (J Thorac Cardiovasc Surg, 93:11-18, 1987). Late in the 80’s he merged interest and experience to join the few centers performing single and double lung transplantation. In 1983 Griffith proposed and performed the first double lung transplant for a young man with cystic fibrosis (NYT nov 6,1983). He developed the use of aerosol cyclosporine suggested by immunologists A Zeevi and R Duquesnoy of Pitt to reduce obliterative bronchiolitis after lung transplantation. From testing in animals to an investigator-initiated FDA approved IND he was awarded an NHLBI grant in 1992 for a randomized human trial that was positive for the novel treatment (N Engl J Med 2006; 354:141-50).
With many patients in need of cardiac replacement he advocated for morbidly ill patients that peers believed too sick to benefit (Ann Thorac Surg, 41:126-129, 1986), he turned to adopting the just introduced total artificial heart in 1985 as a short-term recovery and bridge to await a human donor (N Engl J Med, 316:130-134, 1987.  In 1990 he received his first principal investigator grant from the NHLBI in a late withdrawn trial of the implantable Novacor ventricular assist device (Ann Thorac Surg, 47:142-150, 1989). This work prepared the NIH for the landmark Rematch Destination VAD trial ten years later in 1998. He was an early advocate for professional bioengineering management of patients with VADs (Perfusion J, 5:181-191, 1990).  In 1990 he received the first FDA permission to discharge patients on implanted VADs from the hospital. His partnership with Borovetz provided the impetus for the development of a fully funded $12 million McGowan Center for artificial organ research in 1992. Bill McGowan matched Pittsburgh philanthropic foundations. McGowan, then chairman of MCI, had received a quiet heart transplant earlier by the Griffith/Hardesty team. The center evolved key bioengineering developments that led to the first in human use on July 27,2000 of the novel rotary Heartmate II VAD at the Sheba Hospital in Tel Aviv (Ann Thorac Surg 2001;71: S116-20). There have been more than 15,000 implants of this breakthrough heart pump which enabled a 63% patient survival at 2years.
In 1998 Griffith’s early interest in ECMO was rekindled with a vision to create a system that would be paracorporeal but ergonomic to enable home use and ambulation. The development of a near artificial lung began with support from the NHLBI in 2000. The support followed his move for an additional 20 years to the University of Maryland in 2002. He recruited Zhongjun Wu from McGowan to lead the bioengineering effort on the portable pump-lung system (Ann Thorac Surg 2012;93(1):274-81) . They founded Breethe to commercialize the device and leveraged more than $20 million dollars from the NIH with those from investors (https://doi.org/10.1016/j.apples.2022.10009). Breethe was acquired by Abiomed in 2020, and the device received 510K approval for bedside use. In time it is hoped the system will, like blood pumps have done for hearts provide an temporary or permanent option for sufferers with lung failure.

Griffith joined Muhammad Mohiuddin’s MD xenoheart laboratory in 2018. Together they were able to demonstrate that the heart of a genetically altered pig could support life when transplanted into an orthotopic position in the chest for up to 9 months. Griffith performed the first successful xenotransplantation of a genetically modified pig heart to a human on January 7, 2022. The recipient was 57-year-old David Bennett Sr. The procedure occurred at the University of Maryland Medical Center. Due to complications, David Bennett Sr died on March 8, 2022. The operation has been hailed as a breakthrough procedure (NEJM, May 2022). The patient’s survival for 2 months has infused interest into xenotransplantion as a future option for insufficient human donor organs.

See also 
 Christiaan Barnard
 Xenotransplantation
 Heart transplantation
 Dhaniram Baruah

References

External links 
   Bartley P. Griffith on Shady Side Academy.
 Bartley P. Griffith tells about the transplant.

Cardiac surgery
American surgeons
Living people
20th-century American physicians
21st-century American physicians
1949 births